Nesrin Cavadzade (born 30 July 1982) is a Turkish actress of Azerbaijani origin.

Biography
Nesrin Cavadzade was born in Baku, Azerbaijan SSR (now Azerbaijan). She moved to Istanbul with her mother at the age of 11.

Cavadzade attended Özel Bilgi Lisesi in Şişli for secondary school education and enrolled in the drama club, after secondary school, she attended Şişli Terakki Lisesi where she became a part of the drama club, while studying she was in real there she made five short films, which were screened at local and international festivals, including Berlinale Talent Campus, and received various prizes.

After graduating from Şişli Terakki High School, she enrolled in Marmara University, Fine Arts Faculty, Cinema and TV department. 

She made her television debut in Yersiz Yurtsuz and then appeared in the different TV series, including Görüş Günü Kadınları and Küçük Ağa. She was cast in adaptations of Turkish classic novels  Samanyolu, Al Yazmalım, Ağır Roman Yeni Dünya.

She was awarded the International Antalya Golden Orange Film Festival for Best Supporting Actress for her performance in Güzel Günler Göreceğiz in 2011 and Best Actress in Kuzu in 2014.

She is grandchild of the prominent Azerbaijani scientist, Mirmammad Cavadzade.

Personal life
Nesrin Cavadzade has been dating with Turkish actor Gökhan Alkan since November 2020. In June 2022 rumors started that the couple had separated.

Filmography and awards

Discography
 2020: "Bir Rüya Gördüm" (with Elif Doğan) – from the Love Likes Coincidences 2 soundtrack

References

External links
 
 

1982 births
Living people
Azerbaijani film actresses
Azerbaijani television actresses
Turkish film actresses
Turkish television actresses
21st-century Azerbaijani actresses
21st-century Turkish actresses
Azerbaijani emigrants to Turkey
Best Actress Golden Orange Award winners
Turkish people of Azerbaijani descent